Cala d'Albarca is a cove on the northern seaboard of the Spanish island of Ibiza. The cove is situated within the municipality Sant Antoni de Portmany.

Description
Only the most determined explorer will be able to access the secluded bay. The cove in a large horseshoe with a rocky peninsular either side. Down in the cove there is a rocky beach, but no sand, but the impressive coastline here is scattered with huge boulders. One very impressive feature is a cracked natural arch. There are many flat rocks and ledges close to the waters edge which are good sunbathing spots. The water in the bay is crystal clear and is a deep turquoise when the sun shines. This is the ideal bay for snorkelling and diving.

Gallery

References

Beaches of Ibiza
Beaches of the Balearic Islands